The 1963–64 Spartan League season was the 46th in the history of Spartan League. The league consisted of 18 teams.

League table

The division featured 18 teams, 16 from last season and 2 new teams:
 Croydon Amateurs, from Surrey Senior League
 Willesden, from Aetolian League

References

1963-64
9